Svorka Energi AS is a Norwegian power company owned by the municipalities of Surnadal (41%), Heim (17%), Rindal (17%), and Møre og Romsdal (25%). Its registered office is at Skei. The company's annual sales are approximately 200 million kroner. The company is headed by Halvard Fjeldvær, who succeeded Erlend Eriksen in 2013.

The company consists of:
 Svorka Produksjon AS (a power generation company)
 Svorka Energi AS (a power supplier)
 Svorka Aksess (an internet service provider)

Svorka Produksjon 
Svorka Produksjon AS is a power generation company in Møre og Romsdal with its registered office in Surnadal. The company currently has an ownership interest in the following power plants:

 Valsøyfjord Hydroelectric Power Station (100% ownership)
 Svorka Hydroelectric Power Station (50% ownership, Statkraft 50%)
 Nordsvorka Hydroelectric Power Station (50% ownership, Statkraft 50%)
 Svorka District Heating Plant (75% ownership, Landbrukshuset 25%)
 Brandåa Hydroelectric Power Station (100% ownership)
 Grytdalen Hydroelectric Power Station (100% ownership)

References

External links

Svorka Energi

Electric power companies of Norway
Surnadal
Heim, Norway
Rindal